Menai was an electoral district of the Legislative Assembly in the Australian state of New South Wales from 1999 to 2015. It was most recently represented by Melanie Gibbons of the Liberal Party. Currently, it is the only state seat in the state of New South Wales to have always been represented by a woman. This district was abolished in the 2013 redistribution, largely replaced by Holsworthy.

Members for Menai

Election results

References

External links

Former electoral districts of New South Wales
1999 establishments in Australia
Constituencies established in 1999
2015 disestablishments in Australia
Constituencies disestablished in 2015